Wilhelm Veniaminovich Levick (December 31, 1906 (13 January 1907) in Kiev – September 16, 1982 in Moscow) was a  Russian poet, translator, literary critic and artist. He translated Shakespeare, Byron, Baudelaire, Goethe, Schiller, Heine, La Fontaine, Mickiewicz, Ronsard, Du Bellay, Camões, Petrarch, Gautier, Lenau, Aragon and others. Many famous poets, translators and writers have noted that Levik translations are characterized by high culture, poetry and precision in the transmission of the original.

He wrote a number of theoretical works, which are devoted to how the problems of literary translation and the creativity of major European poets.

References

External links
 Вильгельм Вениаминович Левик  - (живопись, статьи, поэзия, фотоархив)

1907 births
1982 deaths
Soviet translators
20th-century Russian translators
Recipients of the Order of Friendship of Peoples
English–Russian translators
French–Russian translators
Translators from German
Translators from Polish
Translators of Johann Wolfgang von Goethe
Translators of William Shakespeare